Revivalistics: From the Genesis of Israeli to Language Reclamation in Australia and Beyond is a scholarly book written by linguist and revivalist Ghil'ad Zuckermann. It was published in 2020 by Oxford University Press. The book introduces revivalistics, a trans-disciplinary field of enquiry exploring "the dynamics and problematics inherent in spoken language reclamation, revitalization, and reinvigoration".

Summary
The book is divided into two main parts that match the book subtitle: From the Genesis of Israeli (Part One) to Language Reclamation in Australia and Beyond (Part Two). These parts reflect the author's “journey into language revival from the ‘Promised Land’ to the ‘Lucky Country’”. "Applying lessons from the Hebrew revival of the late nineteenth and early twentieth centuries to contemporary endangered languages, Zuckermann takes readers along a fascinating and multifaceted journey into language revival and provides new insights into language genesis."

Part one
The first part of the book provides a radical analysis of the so-far most famous case of language revival: the reclamation of Hebrew, which took place in 1880s-1930s. This analysis contradicts the conventional accounts that the language of the Hebrew Bible is now miraculously re-spoken by modern Israelis. As Rokhl Kafrissen, the New York-based cultural critic and playwright, puts it: "Rather than being a continuation of ancient and mishnaic Hebrew", the result of the Hebrew reclamation according to Zuckermann is "a new language, one whose intrinsic character reflects the mother tongues of its creators."

This part consists of Chapters One to Five:
Chapter One argues that the language emerging from the Hebrew reclamation should be called Israeli. Israeli is Zuckermann's glottonym (language name) for what is otherwise known as Modern Hebrew. According to this chapter, Israeli is a hybridic revival language resulting from cross-fertilization between Hebrew and Yiddish, as well as with other languages that – like Yiddish – were spoken by the Hebrew revivalists. In Zuckermann's terms, Israeli is “a mosaic rather than Mosaic tout court”. According to Kafrissen, "one of the most interesting aspects is how Zuckermann explores (and conceptualizes) the Yiddish substrata of ‘Israeli.’ Not just Yiddish words that have been brought into the language, but the innumerable direct translations (calques) from Yiddish to ‘Israeli’, as well as carried over linguistic forms."
Chapter Two demonstrates in detail that grammatical “cross-fertilization” between the language being revived and the revivalists’ first languages is inevitable even in the case of successful “revival languages”. According to Zuckermann, “revival languages” contradict the tree model in historical linguistics. A tree model implies that a language only has one parent whereas Zuckermann argues that successful “revival languages” follow the Congruence Principle, which is statistical and feature-based. According to Timothy Haines, "Zuckermann advocates acceptance of 'hybridism' rather than 'purism', with a recognition that to be reclaimed and remain a living, accreting language, loanwords and grammatical cross‐fertilizations are unavoidable, particularly from the revivalists' mother tongues." "Zuckermann's revivalistics 'discards any imprisoning purism prism … Hybridization results in new diversity, which is beautiful.' (p. 209 [of Revivalistics])." 
Chapter Three focusses on language as a useful tool for nationhood and vice versa. It provides examples of semantic secularization involving ideological “lexical engineering”, as exemplified by deliberate, subversive processes of extreme semantic shifting, pejoration, amelioration, trivialization and allusion.
Chapter Four proposes that language academies are useful for a revival language – but only until the revival language becomes a “fully-fledged, alive and kicking” tongue.
Chapter Five, entitled “Shift Happens: Tarbutomics, Israeli Culturomics”, explores culturomics as a useful quantitative tool for revivalistics and linguistics. Culturomics is described in this chapter as a trans-disciplinary form of computational lexicology that studies human behaviour, language, and cultural and historical trends through the quantitative analysis of texts. Zuckermann's term tarbutomics is based on תרבות (tarbút), which means “culture”.

Part two
The second part of the book applies lessons from the Hebrew reclamation to language revival movements in Australia and globally. It describes systematically the why of language revival, proposing ethical, aesthetic and utilitarian reasons for language revival. It also describes the how of language revival, offering practical methods for reviving tongues.

According to Professor Joseph Lo Bianco (2020), "Zuckermann expands from the often celebrated case of the revival of the Hebrew in the late nineteenth and early twentieth centuries to discuss what can be learned and applied, and what does not lend itself to such cross-context application, for other endangered languages." "Revivalistics expands the scope of what is aimed for in reversing language shift to contemplating questions beyond revival potential to compensation for acts of historic linguicide and contemporary neglect."

According to Māori Professor Hēmi Whaanga (2020), “there are many insightful lessons that can be garnered from this book to assist and guide our Māori language communities. For individuals and groups involved in language planning, language revitalisation, Māori-medium education contexts, I would definitely recommend the second part of this book. In particular the concept of native tongue title and the notion of seeking compensation for linguicide, and the correlation between language revival and wellbeing, are two areas worthy of further exploration in an Aotearoa New Zealand context. As noted in many places throughout this fascinating book, language is the vehicle that carries our deepest thoughts, our ideas, customs, genealogy, history, mythology, songs, prayers, dreams, hopes, desires, frustrations, anger, knowledge, and identity. It is at the core of our existence.” 

This part consists of Chapters Six to Nine:
Chapter Six proposes “revivalistics” as a beneficial global, comparative, trans-disciplinary field of enquiry. The chapter outlines the history of linguicide (language killing) during colonization in Australia. The chapter also introduces a practical tool: the quadrilateral Language Revival Diamond (acronymized as LARD), featuring four core revivalistic quadrants: (1) language owners, (2) linguistics, (3) education and (4) the public sphere.
Chapter Seven puts forward that technology and talknology (talk+technology) are double-edged swords: they are not only language killers but can also be used to reverse language shift. The chapter describes the development of the Barngarla Dictionary App, and demonstrates two examples of righting the wrong of the past:
A book written in 1844 in order to assist a Lutheran Christian German missionary to introduce the “Christian light” to Aboriginal people is used 170 years later by a secular Jew to assist the Barngarla Aboriginal people to reconnect with their own Aboriginal heritage, which was subject to linguicide conducted by Anglo-Celtic Australians.
Technology, used for colonization (for example, ships and weapons) and Stolen Generations (for example, governmental black cars kidnapping mixed-race (“half-caste”) Aboriginal children from their mothers in order to forcibly assimilate them) is employed (in the form of a mobile app) to assist the Barngarla to reconnect with their cultural autonomy, intellectual sovereignty and spirituality.
Chapter Eight recommends that people whose language was subject to linguicide should be compensated for language loss. Zuckermann terms this compensation “Native Tongue Title”, modelled upon Native Title.
Chapter Nine "presents a compelling analysis of the link between language revival and improved well-being and mental health." Zuckermann first describes research by Darcy Hallett, Michael Chandler and Christopher Lalonde, according to which there is a correlation in British Columbia (Canada) between Aboriginal language loss and youth suicide. Zuckermann then goes on to put forward that there is also a correlation in the other direction. In other words, just as language loss increases suicidal ideation and reduces well-being, language revival reduces suicidal ideation and improves well-being.

Reception
The volume has been described as a "very important" "trailblazing", "seminal", "groundbreaking", "brilliant", "exuberant" "milestone book", “which will be referred to for many years to come".

It was listed as No. 7 in The Australian'''s ranking of "Australia’s top 10 academic books" for 2021.

Anthropologist Dr Timothy Haines states that "Revivalistics is a masterpiece that is both scholarly and social‐minded." Haines says that this "groundbreaking linguistic manuscript is wide‐ranging in its scope, covering specifically Hebrew, Israeli and Barngarla but with references to Chinese, Russian, German, Italian and many other languages."

Rokhl Kafrissen suggests that “Zuckermann is a polyglot polymath and Revivalistics is an ambitious volume" that is "solidly aimed at an audience comfortable with linguistic theory" but that "also offers much to anyone interested in the question of language revival, as well as modern Hebrew and Yiddish.” She adds that “Zuckermann is an irrepressible punster, which makes reading him both very fun and very challenging." For example, "he writes ‘Israeli is not רצח יידיש rétsakh yídish (Israeli for ‘the murder of Yiddish [by Hebrew]’) but rather יידיש רעדט זיך yídish rédt zikh (Yiddish for ‘Yiddish speaks itself [beneath Israeli]’)."

According to Professor Norman Simms, Revivalistics is “a very important technical and contentious book, yet it is also a very funny, punny tome.” “What [Zuckermann] is doing is to save the crazy world from itself, give back a mentality to those who have been pushed or slid off the edge, and that makes him a mensch, a proper human being.” "Zuckermann tells a lot of jokes because that is how languages, spoken, written and felt deep in the kishkas, work: through puns, calques, portmanteau words, borrowings from other languages, playfulness and wit. It is not just that ambiguities and ambivalences can be pinned down by context and analogy, but that the plasticity of speech, emotional expressions, intimate whisperings on the pillow, infantile rage and political necessity require ambiguity and ambivalence. Otherwise nobody ever could get along with anyone else and especially not with oneself."

Professor Joseph Lo Bianco says that "Zuckermann aims to ground Revivalistics in an ethics of wellbeing, and hence a utilitarian case for revival, linked to methodological practices of bottom-up community led but expert-supported, activity. "Ideological considerations [...] are inextricably bound up in all the processes he discusses, from the secular/religious/national debates related to Hebrew [...] to the linguicide (language killing) and glottophagy (language eating) relations of domination in settler colonial history, both part of an historically extended set of linguistic injustices that colonisation wreaked upon the Indigenous populations of Australia." "These two cases, Hebrew and Barngarla, underscore the critical need for historicization of the circumstances of languages weakened by political events and the ideologies that produced those events."

According to Professor Bernard Spolsky, the "brilliance" in the book "is the wide range of detailed knowledge Zuckermann displays. In discussing Modern Israeli Hebrew, he provides numerous examples which reveal not just his full control of the language and of Yiddish and other relevant languages, but an original understanding of the use and history of the items he discusses."

Hēmi Whaanga (2020) writes: “It is a book that very much reflects the author’s fascinating and multifaceted journey from his formative works critically analysing his Israeli mother tongue’s revival efforts through to his passion and focus on language reclamation and empowerment of Aboriginal languages and culture in Australia. This book speaks strongly to his desire to right the wrongs of the past and bringing what he describes as ‘sleeping beauties’ back to life. In recounting these intriguing language journeys, Zuckermann explores the ‘various moral, aesthetic, psychological, cognitive, and economic benefits of language revival” that encompass “social justice, social harmony, diversity, wellbeing, mental health, and employability’.”

The book was commended by actor and writer Stephen Fry ("To linguists Ghil‘ad Zuckermann is already something of a hero. This book shows why. Professor Zuckermann’s account of his work with language reclamation and salvation is as fascinating, enthralling and gripping as any great fictional adventure story, but with a purpose and meaning greater and more noble than any Allan Quatermain or Indiana Jones."); Nobel Laureate J. M. Coetzee ("In Revivalistics, technically rigorous in content yet approachable in presentation, Ghil‘ad Zuckermann mounts a persuasive argument that the language spoken by ordinary Israelis is best thought of as a hybrid. He uses the story of the successful revival of Hebrew to propose how near-extinct Aboriginal languages of Australia can be brought back to life with immeasurable benefit to their traditional owners. With a multitude of the world’s languages staring oblivion in the face, this will be a key text for the new discipline that Zuckermann calls revivalistics."); cultural historian Peter Burke ("Zuckermann is a polymath, as well as a polyglot, and Revivalistics is a brilliant study, challenging the conventional wisdom in its field, making good use of comparative material, sparkling with perceptive one-liners and making an eloquent argument for the revival of endangered languages."); and linguistics author and Foundation for Endangered Languages chairman Nicholas Ostler ("Zuckermann gives a linguist's insider view of his native tongue, Hebrew as they now speak it in Israel, including its rollicking humour. He shows how a language could literally ‘arise from the dead’ but also how different is the task of reviving other languages today.")

Key concepts introduced in the book
The book introduces various revivalistic concepts such as the following:

Revivalistics (in diametric opposition to documentary linguistics)
Zuckermann’s term, revivalistics, refers to a trans-disciplinary field of enquiry surrounding language reclamation, revitalization and reinvigoration from any angle, for example law, mental health, psychology, health, linguistics, anthropology, sociology, geography, politics, history, biology, evolution, genetics, genomics, colonization studies, missionary studies, media, animation films, technology, talknology, art, theatre, dance, agriculture, archaeology, music, education, games (indirect learning), pedagogy and architecture.

The book makes a strong case for a clear professional distinction between "revivalistics" and documentary linguistics (the established field recording endangered languages before they fall asleep). The book argues that whereas documentary linguistics puts the language at the centre, revivalistics puts the speakers at the centre.

Zuckermann argues that "a revivalist is not only a linguist but also a teacher, driver, schlepper, financial manager, cook, waiter, psychologist, social worker, babysitter, donor etc. A language revivalist must have a heart of gold, 'balls' of steel and the patience of a saint."

The book promotes a revivalistic revision of the following two fields: 
grammaticography (writing grammars)
lexicography (writing dictionaries)

It proposes that grammars and dictionaries ought to be written for language reclamation in a user-friendly way, accessible to lay communities, not only to professional linguists. For example, highfalutin, flowery, often Latin-based, grammatical terminology should be avoided. User-friendly spelling should also be employed.

Reclamation, Revitalization and Reinvigoration
The book identifies three types of processes on the revival continuum:Reclamation is the revival of what Zuckermann calls a sleeping beauty, a no-longer spoken language, for example Hebrew, the Barngarla Aboriginal language of South Australia, Kaurna, Massachusett language (Wampanoag), Siraya, Miami-Illinois language (Myaamia) and Tunica.Revitalization is the revival of a severely moribund, endangered language, for example Adnyamathanha, Walmajarri and Karuk.Reinvigoration is the revival of an endangered language that still has a high percentage of children speaking it, for example Welsh, Irish and Catalan.

Revival Language (Revlang)
The book recommends to regard a language emerging from a successful revival as a Revival Language (revlang). According to the book, revival languages share many common characteristics; and they should therefore be classified under the “revival language” “family” rather than under a specific family tree language family.

A revlang is a language derived from an evolved language that stopped being used natively but which is being proposed for a return to use, usually by descendants of the original speakers.
 
The book suggests that there are various similarities between revlangs and conlangs (constructed languages).
 Conlangs are subdivided into artlangs (artistic languages, such as Klingon and Quenya) and auxlangs (International auxiliary languages such as Esperanto and Volapük).
 
Similarly, the book proposes a subdivision of revlangs into reclangs (reclaimed languages, which have ceased to be spoken entirely) and reinlangs (reinvigorated and revitalized languages, both of which are endangered but still spoken).
 
Founder Principle and Congruence Principle
The book suggests that a successful “revival language” is characterized by two principles: the Founder Principle and the Congruence Principle:

Founder Principle 
According to the Founder Principle, an emerging revival language is predetermined by the characteristics of the languages spoken by the founder population. In the context of Israeli, “Yiddish is a primary contributor to Israeli because it was the mother tongue of the vast majority of revivalists and first pioneers in Eretz Yisrael (“Land of Israel”, Palestine) at the critical period of the beginning of Israeli”.
 
Zuckermann theorizes the Founder Principle works because by the time later immigrants came to Israel, Israeli had already consolidated the fundamental parts of its grammar. Thus, Moroccan Jews arriving in Israel in the 1950s had to learn a fully-fledged language. 

Congruence Principle 
According to the Congruence Principle, the more contributing languages a linguistic feature occurs in, the more likely it is to persist in the emerging revival language. 
 
Zuckermann argues that the principle works inadvertently, regardless of whether or not the revivalists want that.
 
Zuckermann has already applied the Congruence Principle to lexicon, when he explored phono-semantic matching in the book Language Contact and Lexical Enrichment in Israeli Hebrew. However, in Revivalistics, he applies it further, to grammar and to the analysis of the genetics of the entire language.
 
Linguicide and Native Tongue Title
Zuckermann models the term “Native Tongue Title” on Native Title. Native Tongue Title is compensation for linguicide (language killing). Native Tongue Title is the enactment of an ex gratia compensation scheme for the loss of Indigenous languages.
 
According to Zuckermann, although some Australian states have enacted ex gratia compensation schemes for the victims of the Stolen Generations policies, the victims of linguicide are overlooked. The book argues that existing competitive grant schemes by the Australian government to support Aboriginal languages should be complemented with compensation schemes, which are based on a claim of right rather than on competition.
 
Nonetheless, Timothy Haines argues that "Zuckermann's remarkable achievement" of reclaiming the Barngarla language "arguably assisted in the process of the recognition of the Barngarla people's native title. Indeed, the Federal Court judge presiding over the Barngarla's native title hearing, Justice John Mansfield noted that the Barngarla's active pursuit of language revival — empowered by Zuckermann's renewed “revivalist” efforts — was a clear indication of their continued connection with their land and culture. This was despite the separation that many had endured as “Stolen Generation” children of the 1960s and 70s, when they were forcibly removed by the State to homes in Adelaide, far distant from their native Eyre Peninsula in South Australia's west."

Sleeping Beauty and Dreaming Beauty
The book introduces the metaphor sleeping beauty to describe a no-longer natively spoken language such as Hebrew and Barngarla. According to Zuckermann, the term “sleeping beauty” is a positive and poetic way to champion and celebrate dormant tongues. The term avoids the negative connotations of alternatives such as “dead” or “extinct”, which are often rejected or rebuked by indigenous people all over the globe.
 
The book also proposes the metaphor "dreaming beauty" to describe specifically an Australian Aboriginal sleeping beauty. The reason is the Australian Aboriginal concept known in English as The Dreaming – see the words jukurrpa in Warlpiri and altjira in Arrernte.

Ethical, aesthetic and utilitarian reasons for language revival
The book identifies three main types of reasons for language revival:Babbel: Why Revive A Dead Language? - Interview with Prof. Ghil‘ad Zuckermann.
 
Ethical (or more specifically deontological) reasons: the right thing to do to right the wrong of the past. Languages that underwent linguicide simply deserve to be reclaimed.
Aesthetic reasons: a world with language diversity is more beautiful.
Utilitarian reasons: the useful/beneficial thing to do to maximize happiness in our society, for example improving wellbeing and mental health.
 
Langue, land and lens
The book describes the importance of the “trinity” langue-land-lens (which is an alliteration) for any group of people seeking a modern nationhood:Langue, that is language, a national tongue.Land, that is territory, for example Israel in the case of Zionism.Lens, that is cultural lens, Weltanschauung, heritage.
 
TarbutomicsTarbutomics is Israeli culturomics, the latter being a trans-disciplinary form of computational lexicology that studies human behaviour, language, and cultural and historical trends through the quantitative analysis of texts. Zuckermann's term is based on תרבות (tarbút), the "Israeli word" for “culture”. It is therefore a calque (loan-translation) of the term culturomics''.

References

Bibliography

  (hardback)

External links
Oxford University Press: Revivalistics: From the Genesis of Israeli to Language Reclamation in Australia and Beyond
Google Books: Revivalistics: From the Genesis of Israeli to Language Reclamation in Australia and Beyond
WorldCat: Revivalistics: From the Genesis of Israeli to Language Reclamation in Australia and Beyond
Why we should revive dead languages, OUPBlog

Oxford University Press books
2020 non-fiction books
Linguistics books
Language revival
Modern Hebrew
English-language books
Books about Jews and Judaism
Anthropology books
Australian Aboriginal languages